James Bulliard (born August 23, 1978) is a Canadian actor known for his roles in On The Line, The Mystery Files of Shelby Woo, That Was Then, and others.

Early life and education 
Born in Bern, Switzerland, he moved to Canada at the age of three and began his career on a radio program called Not the History of Rock and Roll at the age of six (for which he received an ACTRA award nomination.) While attending Trinity College, Toronto, he won the college's award for Best Actor for his portrayal of Sir John Barrymore in a production of Paul Rudnick's I Hate Hamlet.

Career 
Bulliard's first role in a feature film occurred in 1993, when he appeared in the movie Ordinary Magic, starring Glenn Headly and Ryan Reynolds. 

Although his work has been concentrated mainly in Canada and consisted of guest roles on such series as Tekwar, The Mystery Files of Shelby Woo and Real Kids, Real Adventures, his first big break occurred in 2001, when he was cast as "Randy" in On The Line.

The movie was a relative flop at the box office, but soon after it garnered Bulliard some attention from south of the border, and he was cast as the lead character in the now-defunct 2002 ABC drama That Was Then. The show lasted only two weeks before being pulled from the network lineup, due to poor ratings.

After the cancellation of That Was Then, Bulliard picked up a few sparse guest roles on such series as Mutant X, Relic Hunter and NYPD Blue, but for the most part his career fizzled out after his short-lived success with That Was Then. In July 2006, he was interviewed by Los Angeles writer Tim Coyne on "The Hollywood Podcast"; during this interview he narrated the events of his life both before and after the collapse of the show.

Filmography

Film

Television

References

Trinity College (Canada) alumni
University of Toronto alumni
1978 births
Living people
People from Bern